Marianne Strauß may refer to:

Marianne Strauß (née Zwicknagl; 1930-1984), wife of Franz Josef Strauss
Marianne Strauss (1923-1996), Jewish Holocaust survivor